The Ephrussi family is a Ukrainian Jewish banking and oil dynasty. The family's bank and properties were seized by the Nazi authorities after the 1938 "Anschluss", the annexation of Austria by Nazi Germany.

History
The progenitor, Charles Joachim Ephrussi (1792–1864), from Berdichev, made a fortune controlling grain distribution beginning in the free port of Odessa (then Russian Empire, now Ukraine) and later controlled large-scale oil resources across Crimea and the Caucasus. By 1860, the family was the world’s largest exporter of wheat.

Charles Joachim's eldest son, Leonid (d. 1877), founded a bank in Odessa, while his brother Ignaz (1829–1899) moved to the Austrian capital, Vienna, where he established the Ephrussi & Co. banking house in 1856. In 1872, he was elevated to the noble rank of Ritter by Habsburg emperor Franz Joseph I. In 1871, Leonid, together with his younger half-brothers Michel (1845–1914) and Maurice Ephrussi (1849–1916), founded a branch in Paris, followed by subsidiaries in London and Athens.

During the 19th century, the family possessed vast wealth and owned many castles, palaces, and estates in Europe. The family members were known for their connoisseurship, intellectual interests, and their huge collections of art. Leonid's son Charles Ephrussi (1849–1905), a well-known art historian, collector and editor, became a model for the character of Charles Swann in Marcel Proust's novel In Search of Lost Time.

The family name is considered to be a variation of Ephrati, as a reference to "Ephraim" in 1 Samuel , a Hebrew family name attested in the 14th century in the Iberian Peninsula (modern Spain and Portugal) as Efrati and later in central Europe and Russia as Ephrati or Ephrussi.

Notable members
Notable members of the Ephrussi family include:
 Ignace von Ephrussi (1829–1899), Austrian banker
 Michel Ephrussi (1845–1914), French banker
 Jules Ephrussi (1846–1915), French banker
 Charles Ephrussi (1849–1905), art historian, proprietor of the Gazette des Beaux-Arts, an inspiration for Charles Swann in Marcel Proust's À la recherche du temps perdu
 Maurice Ephrussi (1849–1916), French banker
 Viktor von Ephrussi (1860–1945), Austrian banker
 Béatrice de Rothschild-Ephrussi (1864–1934), member of the Rothschild family and wife of Maurice Ephrussi 
 Fanny Reinach (1870–1917)
  (1880–1964)
 Elisabeth de Waal (1899–1991)
 Gisela von Ephrussi (1904–1985)
 Ignace von Ephrussi (1906–1994)
 Rudolf von Ephrussi (1918–1971)
 Robert de Waal
 Victor de Waal (born 1929), British Anglican priest, former Dean of Canterbury
 Constant Hendrik de Waal (1931–2016), became Sir Henry de Waal, First Parliamentary Counsel 1987–1991
 Hendrik de Waal (born 1955), real estate developer
 Anne Ephrussi (born 1955), group leader at EMBL since 1992, head of the Developmental Biology Unit since 2007
 John de Waal (born 1962), British barrister
 Alexander de Waal (born 1963), British writer and journalist, executive director of World Peace Foundation, founder of human rights organisations African Rights and Justice Africa, director of Social Science Research Council on AIDS New York
 Edmund de Waal (born 1964), British potter, author of The Hare with Amber Eyes
 Thomas de Waal (born 1966), British journalist (BBC, The Moscow Times and The Times), Caucasus expert, Caucasus editor at Institute for War and Peace Reporting, senior associate at Carnegie Endowment for International Peace

Properties

Notable properties of the family included:
 Palais Ephrussi, a Ringstraßenpalais in Vienna
 Hôtel de Breteuil, 12 avenue Foch, Paris
 Hôtel Michel Ephrussi, 81 , Paris (built for Michel Ephrussi, c. 1871)
 Hôtel Jules Ephrussi, 2 place des États-Unis, Paris (built for Jules Ephrussi, 1886)
 Hôtel Charles Ephrussi, 11 avenue d'Iéna, Paris (home of Charles Ephrussi; later demolished)
 Villa Ephrussi de Rothschild in Saint-Jean-Cap-Ferrat on the Côte d'Azur
 Villa Kerylos in Beaulieu-sur-Mer on the Côte d'Azur

Other Ephrussi
Descendants of the Kishinev banker Joseph Ephrusi (Efrusi):
 Boris Ephrussi (1901–1979) — Russo-French geneticist, Professor of Genetics at the University of Paris.
 Perla Ephrussi (also Paula and Polina Ephrussi, 1876, Kishinev – 1942, Pyatigorsk) – Russian educational psychologist.
  (1878, Kishinev – 1942, Pyatigorsk) — Soviet pediatric researcher.

The Hare with Amber Eyes
The Hare with Amber Eyes (2010) is a family memoir of the Ephrussi family by British potter Edmund de Waal, whose grandmother was Elisabeth Ephrussi.

References

 
Jewish Ukrainian history
Jewish Austrian history
Jewish French history